The 2022 Italian GT Championship was the 31st season of the Italian GT Championship, the grand tourer-style sports car racing founded by the Italian automobile club (Automobile Club d'Italia). The Championship consisted of four Sprint race events and four Endurance race events. At each Sprint race event there were two races. The Season started on 23 April at Monza and ended on 23 October at Autodromo Internazionale del Mugello.

Calendar

Teams and Drivers

GT3

GT Cup

GT4

References

Italian Motorsports Championships
Italian GT Championship